The 2017 Copa do Brasil First Round was played from 8 February to 16 February 2017, deciding the 40 teams that advanced to the Second Round. In this year, this round was decided in a single match. The lower ranked team hosted the match and, in tie cases, the higher ranked team advanced to next round.

Matches

|}

Match 1

Match 2

Match 3

Match 4

Match 5

Match 6

Match 7

Match 8

Match 9

Match 10

Match 11

Match 12

Match 13

Match 14

Match 15

Match 16

Match 17

Match 18

Match 19

Match 20

Match 21

Match 22

Match 23

Match 24

Match 25

Match 26

Match 27

Match 28

Match 29

Match 30

Match 31

Match 32

Match 33

Match 34

Match 35

Match 36

Match 37

Match 38

Match 39

Match 40

References

2017 Copa do Brasil